Captain John Lyons,  (20 October 1760 – 6 February 1816) was a British owner of extensive sugar plantations, of 563 acres in total, in Antigua, where he served as a politician and a Captain in the Royal Navy.

He married Catherine Walrond, the daughter of the 5th Marquis de Vallado and Sarah Lyons (1731-1764). John and Catherine Lyons
had 15 children, including Edmund Lyons, 1st Baron Lyons. John's grandchildren included Richard Lyons, 1st Viscount Lyons, the diplomat who solved the Trent Affair, Sir Algernon McLennan Lyons, Admiral of the Fleet, and Richard Lyons Pearson, Assistant Commissioner of the Metropolitan Police.

Life

Family
John was born in Antigua on 20 October 1760. He was the eldest of 11 children. His father was John Lyons (1731-1775), who had succeeded to the 563-acre Lyons Estate in Antigua in 1748 and served as a member of the Council of Antigua from 1764 to 1775. His grandfather and great-grandfather had also been members of the council.
John's great-grandfather Major Henry Lyons had emigrated from River Lyons, King's County, Ireland, the Irish seat of the Lyons family.

The family is not Irish in origin, but a noble Norman-English family descended from the Norman Baron Sir John de Lyons, who arrived in England with the Norman Conquest and was granted lands at Warkworth, Northamptonshire, where the family seat was Warkworth Castle (Northamptonshire).

John's mother was Jane Harman (1733-1792), the daughter of Colonel Samuel Harman, who was elected a Member of Assembly for Nonsuch in 1727 and later a Member of Council and Judge of the Court of Common Pleas.

Life

John Lyons succeeded to the 563-acre Lyons Estate in Antigua. He was sworn in as a member of the Council of Antigua in 1782. After the death of their second child, in 1803, John and his wife, Catherine, returned to England and settled at St Austin's, a 190-acre estate in the New Forest, Lymington, Hampshire.

John Lyons died 6 February 1816 in England. A memorial inscription to him exists at Boldre, near Lymington.

Family
Lyons married Catherine Walrond in 1784, daughter of Maine Swete Walrond, 5th Marquis de Vallado. The couple had 15 children: five of the sons entered the service of the East India Company, one entered the British Army, and three entered the Royal Navy. Following Catherine's premature death in 1803, John married Elizabeth Robbins (26 November 1767 – 18 October 1820), daughter of William Robbins of Salisbury, Wiltshire, on 17 March 1804.

The following are those children by John's first marriage to Catherine Walrond:

 Jane Lyons (1785 - 1803).
 Eliza Lyons (1786 - 1786)
 Vice-Admiral John Lyons (1787 - 1872). Fought on HMS Victory at Battle of Trafalgar and served as British Ambassador in Egypt. He married, firstly, Caroline Bowen, and, secondly, Anna Maria Ferguson.
 Theodore Lyons (1788 - 1825, d. East Indies)
 Lieutenant Henry Lyons, (1789 - 1807, killed in action at Copenhagen)
 Admiral Edmund Lyons, 1st Baron Lyons, (1790 - 1858). Father of Richard Lyons, 1st Viscount Lyons, who was British Ambassador to USA during the American Civil War, and subsequently British Ambassador to France.
 Anne Lyons (1792 - 1816)
 Catherine Lyons (1794 - 1857), artist.
 William Lyons, (1795 -1795).
 George Rose Lyons, (1796 - 1828), member of East India Company.
 William Mills Lyons (1797-1881), Royal Artillery. Married Mary Ann Adams.
 Lieutenant Maine Walrond Lyons, (1798-1827). Killed at Battle of Navarino.
 Caroline Lyons, (1800-1879). Married in 1820 Henry Shepherd Pearson, Governor of Penang (d.1840). Mother of Richard Lyons Otway Pearson, Assistant Commissioner of the Metropolitan Police.
 Lieutenant-General Humphrey Lyons (1802-1873), Indian (Bombay) Army. Married Adelaide Matilda, daughter of 3rd Viscount Avonmore. Father of Sir Algernon McLennan Lyons, Admiral of the Fleet.
 Charles Bethel Lyons, (1803-1864). Married, in 1826, Mrs. Susannah Elizabeth Sockett (d.1847), and, secondly, in 1848, Henrietta Moore (d.1880).

The following are the children of John by his second wife Elizabeth:

 Lieutenant-Colonel Samuel Athill Lyons (1805 - 1881), Indian (Bengal) Army. Married Sophia (d.1840), daughter of Colonel Logie, and, secondly, in 1842, Mary Wall (d.1893).
 Frances Walrond Lyons, (1806 - 1884).
 Captain Edward Robbins Lyons, (1807 - 1849), Indian Army.

See also
Lyons family

Sources and further reading

References

1760 births
1816 deaths
Royal Navy officers
Antigua and Barbuda politicians